John Alcala (May 23, 1959), is a Democratic member of the Kansas House of Representatives, representing the 57th district (Topeka, Kansas in Shawnee County, Kansas). He is a graduate of both Topeka High School and Washburn University. For 14 years he was a member of the Topeka City Council after which he became city's Deputy Mayor.

References

External links
State Page
Ballotpedia

1959 births
Democratic Party members of the Kansas House of Representatives
Living people
Place of birth missing (living people)
Politicians from Topeka, Kansas
Hispanic and Latino American state legislators
21st-century American politicians
Washburn University alumni